Eagleville is a census-designated place in Modoc County, California. Its population is 45 as of the 2020 census, down from 59 from the 2010 census.

Located in Surprise Valley, Eagleville is a small community south of Cedarville. The ZIP code is 96110.

Wired telephone numbers in the community follow the format (530) 279-2xxx or 279-6xxx and appear to be served out of the Cedarville exchange. Wired telephone service is provided by Citizens Utilities. The Eagleville Airport, (FAA identifier: A22), is closed indefinitely as of winter 2000.

History

The first post office at Eagleville opened in 1868. A 1913 book described Eagleville, Modoc County as being on one of the Alkali Lakes and having a population of 150.

Geography
According to the United States Census Bureau, the CDP covers an area of 1.0 square mile (2.5 km), all land.

Demographics
The 2010 United States Census reported that Eagleville had a population of 59. The racial makeup of Eagleville was 58 (98.3%) White, 0 (0.0%) African American, 0 (0.0%) Native American, 0 (0.0%) Asian, 0 (0.0%) Pacific Islander, 1 (1.7%) from other races, and 0 (0.0%) from two or more races. Hispanic or Latino of any race were 2 persons (3.4%).

The Census reported that 59 people (100% of the population) lived in households.

There were 29 households, out of which 4 (13.8%) had children under the age of 18 living in them, 13 (44.8%) were opposite-sex married couples living together, 5 (17.2%) had a female householder with no husband present, 2 (6.9%) had a male householder with no wife present.  There were 4 (13.8%) unmarried opposite-sex partnerships, and 0 (0%) same-sex married couples or partnerships. 5 households (17.2%) were made up of individuals, and 2 (6.9%) had someone living alone who was 65 years of age or older. The average household size was 2.03.  There were 20 families (69.0% of all households); the average family size was 2.30.

The population was spread out, with 8 people (13.6%) under the age of 18, 1 people (1.7%) aged 18 to 24, 9 people (15.3%) aged 25 to 44, 26 people (44.1%) aged 45 to 64, and 15 people (25.4%) who were 65 years of age or older.  The median age was 56.6 years. For every 100 females, there were 126.9 males.  For every 100 females age 18 and over, there were 104.0 males.

The homeowner vacancy rate was 0%; the rental vacancy rate was 0%.  42 people (71.2% of the population) lived in owner-occupied housing units and 17 people (28.8%) lived in rental housing units.

Notable residents

Joseph Floyd "Arky" Vaughan (March 9, 1912–August 30, 1952), an American professional baseball player. He played 14 seasons in Major League Baseball between 1932 and 1948 for the Pittsburgh Pirates and Brooklyn Dodgers, primarily as a shortstop. After his retirement from baseball, he owned a ranch near Eagleville; he drowned in an accident while fishing with a friend. He was elected to the National Baseball Hall of Fame in 1985.

Politics

References

Census-designated places in Modoc County, California
Census-designated places in California